1B-LSD (N1-butyryl-lysergic acid diethylamide) is an acylated derivative of lysergic acid diethylamide (LSD), which has been sold as a designer drug. In tests on mice it was found to be an active psychedelic, though with only around 1/7 the potency of LSD itself.

Legal status 
1B-LSD is illegal in Singapore. Sweden's public health agency suggested classifying 1B-LSD as a hazardous substance, on June 24, 2019.

See also 
 Lysergic acid diethylamide (LSD)
 1cP-LSD
 1P-LSD
 1V-LSD
 ALD-52
 1cP-AL-LAD
 AL-LAD
 ETH-LAD
 1P-ETH-LAD
 PRO-LAD
 LSM-775
 LSZ
 O-Acetylpsilocin (4-AcO-DMT)

References 

Designer drugs
Lysergamides
Prodrugs
Serotonin receptor agonists